The Eurovision Young Dancers 1987 was the second edition of the Eurovision Young Dancers, held at the Schlosstheater Schwetzingen, Germany on 31 May 1987. Organised by the European Broadcasting Union (EBU) and host broadcaster Zweites Deutsches Fernsehen (ZDF), dancers from fourteen countries participated in the televised final.

For the first time ever, the Canadian broadcaster CBC (EBU Associate Member) joined the show with its participant, making it the only Eurovision event to feature a country from North America, and the only EBU event to feature an associate member as a participant prior to Australia's debut at the Eurovision Song Contest in 2015. The participant countries could send one or two dancers, male or female, that could not be older than 20. Each entry consisted in one or two dances with no rules or limitations regarding the style. The dances could not be longer than 5 minutes (for soloists) or 10 minutes (for couples).

Rose Gad Poulsen and Nikolaj Hübbe of Denmark won the contest, with Switzerland and West Germany placing second and third respectively.

Location

Schlosstheater Schwetzingen (Schwetzingen palace theater), a court theater in Schwetzingen, Baden-Württemberg, Germany was the host venue for the 1987 edition of the Eurovision Young Dancers.

The historic building, opened in 1753, is part of Schloss Schwetzingen and since 1952 the principal venue of the Schwetzingen Festival. It is also called Hoftheater (court theater), Hofoper (court opera), and Comoedienhaus (comedy house). The frequently applied name Rokokotheater (Rococo theater) is misleading, because it shows also neoclassical elements, added in 1762.

Format
The format consists of dancers who are non-professional and between the ages of 16–21, competing in a performance of dance routines of their choice, which they have prepared in advance of the competition. All of the acts then take part in a choreographed group dance during 'Young Dancers Week'.

Jury members of a professional aspect and representing the elements of ballet, contemporary, and modern dancing styles, score each of the competing individual and group dance routines. The overall winner upon completion of the final dances is chosen by the professional jury members.

The interval was Arne Fagerholt who performed Kjersti Alveberg's production Spirits.

Results

Final
Awards were given to the top three countries. The table below highlights these using gold, silver, and bronze. The placing results of the remaining participants is unknown and never made public by the European Broadcasting Union.

Jury members
The jury members consisted of the following:

  – Paolo Bortoluzzi (Head of jury)
  – Frank Andersen
  – Oscar Araiz
  – Celia Franca
  – Mary Hinkson
  – Mette Hønningen
  – Galina Samsova
  – Heinz Spoerli
  – José de Udaeta

Broadcasting
The 1987 Young Dancers competition was broadcast in at least 15 countries.

See also
 Eurovision Song Contest 1987

Notes and references

Notes

References

External links 
 

Eurovision Young Dancers by year
1987 in West Germany
May 1987 events in Europe
Entertainment events in Germany